The 2014 Paradise Jam was an early-season men's and women's college basketball tournament. The tournament, which began in 2000, was part of the 2014-15 NCAA Division I men's basketball season and 2014-15 NCAA Division I women's basketball season.  The tournament was played at the Sports and Fitness Center in Saint Thomas, U.S. Virgin Islands, Seton Hall won the men's tournament, in the women's tournament Florida Gulf Coast won the Island Division and Kentucky won the women's Reef Division.

Men's tournament

Bracket

Women's tournament
The women's tournament was played from November 27–29. The women's tournament consisted of eight teams split into two 4-team, round-robin divisions: Island and Reef.

Island Division

Reef Division

References

Paradise Jam Tournament
Paradise Jam
Paradise Jam